`Urjan ash Sharqiyah is a town in the Amman Governorate of north-western Jordan. It is north of the capital of Amman.

References

Populated places in Amman Governorate